Avellara is a genus of flowering plants in the dandelion family.

There is only one known species, Avellara fistulosa, native to Spain and Portugal.

References

Monotypic Asteraceae genera
Cichorieae
Flora of Southwestern Europe